Kerry Marisa Washington (born January 31, 1977) is an American actress. She gained wide public recognition for starring as crisis management expert Olivia Pope in the ABC drama series Scandal (2012–2018). For her role, she was twice nominated for the Primetime Emmy Award for Outstanding Lead Actress in a Drama Series and once for the Golden Globe Award for Best Actress – Television Series Drama. Her portrayal of Anita Hill in the HBO television political thriller film Confirmation (2016), and her role as Mia Warren in the Hulu miniseries Little Fires Everywhere (2020), both earned nominations for the Primetime Emmy Award for Outstanding Lead Actress in a Miniseries or a Movie.

In film, Washington is known for her roles as Della Bea Robinson in Ray (2004), as Kay in The Last King of Scotland (2006), as Alicia Masters in the live-action Fantastic Four films of 2005 and 2007, and as Broomhilda von Shaft in Quentin Tarantino's Django Unchained (2012). She has also starred in the independent films Our Song (2000), The Dead Girl (2006), Mother and Child (2009), Night Catches Us (2010), and American Son (2019).

Time magazine included Washington in its Time 100 list of most influential people in 2014. In 2018, Forbes named her the eighth highest-paid television actress. Washington has won a Primetime Emmy Award and five NAACP Image Awards, including The President's Award.

Early life and education
Washington was born in the Bronx, New York City, the daughter of Valerie, a professor and educational consultant, and Earl Washington, a real estate broker. Her father's family is of African American origin, having moved from South Carolina to Brooklyn. Her mother's family is from Manhattan, and Washington has said that her mother is from a "mixed-race background and from Jamaica, so she is partly English and Scottish and Native American, but also descended from enslaved Africans in the Caribbean." Through her mother, she is a cousin of former U.S. Secretary of State Colin Powell.

Washington performed with the TADA! Youth Theater teen group and attended the Spence School in Manhattan from her pre-teen years until graduating from high school in 1994. At the age of 13, she was taken to watch Nelson Mandela speak at Yankee Stadium upon his release from prison. She attended George Washington University, graduating Phi Beta Kappa in 1998 with a double major in anthropology and sociology. She also studied at Michael Howard Studios in New York City.

In April 2016, Washington confirmed that, in the 1990s in New York, she learned to dance from Jennifer Lopez. During her appearance on The Tonight Show Starring Jimmy Fallon, she told host Jimmy Fallon: "I've been taking dance for a long time, since I was a little girl. I had this very inspiring teacher named Larry Maldonado, for anybody from my neighborhood in the Bronx, he was our role model. ... And he had an awesome substitute teacher named Jennifer, who would sometimes step in and teach. But, then she left to move to Los Angeles and be on the TV show In Living Color. So, yes, I learned to dance from JLo!"

Career

1994–2009: Beginnings and breakthrough

Washington got her Screen Actors Guild (SAG) card as a requirement for a commercial that she starred in. Washington made her screen debut in the ABC telefilm Magical Make-Over (1994). She was in the cast of the 1996 PBS sketch comedy-style educational series Standard Deviants, and she appeared in the short "3D" and the feature film Our Song in 2000. She went on to appear in several movies, including Save the Last Dance (2001) and The Human Stain (2003). In 2002 she played Chris Rock's love interest in the spy thriller Bad Company, a film that represented a turning point for her, in that it was the first time in her career that she had made enough money annually to qualify for health insurance under SAG.

In 2004, she played the female lead in Spike Lee's She Hate Me, and she received strong reviews for her performance. After 2004, she held parts in Mr. & Mrs. Smith (2005), Little Man (2006), I Think I Love My Wife (2007), and as a wife of 1970s Ugandan dictator Idi Amin in the UK historical drama The Last King of Scotland (2006). Washington has also appeared in the recurring role of Chelina Hall on the ABC television series Boston Legal, and in several episodes of the A&E cable-TV series 100 Centre Street. In 2007, she co-directed and appeared in the music video for hip-hop artist Common's song, "I Want You", the fourth single from his album Finding Forever
and became a spokesperson for L'Oréal, appearing in commercials and ads alongside fellow actresses, Scarlett Johansson and Eva Longoria, Gong Li, Michelle Yeoh, Dian Sastrowardoyo, Aishwarya Rai, Maya Karin and model Doutzen Kroes.

Washington narrated the critically acclaimed documentary about the New Orleans-based teenage TBC Brass Band, From the Mouthpiece on Back. She also appears in Maxwell's "Bad Habits" video. In 2009, Washington performed in The People Speak, a documentary feature film that uses dramatic and musical performances of the letters, diaries, and speeches of everyday Americans, based on historian Howard Zinn's A People's History of the United States.

2010–2018: Scandal and critical acclaim
In 2010, Washington made her Broadway debut in the original production of David Mamet's play Race, alongside James Spader (with whom she worked on Boston Legal), David Alan Grier, and Richard Thomas. She also appeared as a part of the ensemble in Tyler Perry's 2010 drama film For Colored Girls.

She starred in Quentin Tarantino's film Django Unchained (2012), which received widespread critical acclaim. She was invited to join the Academy of Motion Picture Arts and Sciences in June 2012 along with 175 other individuals.

From April 2012 to April 2018, Washington starred in the ABC drama series Scandal, created by Shonda Rhimes, as Olivia Pope, a crisis manager who runs her own crisis management firm called Olivia Pope & Associates in Washington, D.C. In this position, she worked for high-profile figures, most notably the President of the United States, who was also her on-off lover. The show was a commercial and critical success, and was called one of the most talked about drama series on Facebook and Twitter. Washington's performance earned positive reviews, and in 2013, she won the award for Outstanding Actress in a Drama Series at the 44th NAACP Image Awards and was also presented with the NAACP President's Award. The same year, she was named "Favorite actress" and Scandal "Favorite Drama" of the year at TV Guide'''s Magazine Fan Favorite Awards and was also crowned 2013's "TV Star of the Year" by the editors of the magazine.

For her work in the second season of Scandal, Washington was nominated for an Emmy at the 65th Primetime Emmy Awards and 66th Primetime Emmy Awards, becoming the first African-American woman to be nominated in the category of Outstanding Lead Actress in a Drama Series in 18 years. She was also nominated for a Screen Actors Guild Award for Outstanding Performance by a Female Actor in a Drama Series as well as a Golden Globe Award for Best Actress in a Television Drama Series. The Boston Globe ranked Scandal tenth place of its list of "Top 10 political TV shows" in 2015.

In addition to Washington's acting, her costumes as Olivia Pope attracted positive attention, prompting Vanity Fair to name the character one of  "The Top Ten Best-Dressed TV Characters" in 2013. According to the show's costume designer, Lyn Paolo, the success of Olivia Pope's wardrobe was based on "this idea of having [her character] wear such soft, feminine colors in a man's world". In 2014, Washington and Paolo won the Influencer Award at the 2014 Ace Fashion Awards for Olivia Pope's stylish clothes on the show.

In 2013, Washington ranked No. 2 in People magazine's 100 Most Beautiful people and was named Woman of the Year by Glamour magazine. The same year, she ranked No. 20 on Forbes magazine's annual list of the highest-paid actors in television and was announced as the new face of Neutrogena skin care. Washington hosted Saturday Night Live on November 2, 2013, where she impersonated Michelle Obama and Oprah Winfrey in a cold opening sketch that satirized criticism of Saturday Night Live for not having had any black female cast members for many years.

Washington played the lead role in Confirmation, an HBO movie directed by Rick Famuyiwa about Anita Hill's testimony during Clarence Thomas Supreme Court nomination, which aired in 2016. For her role in Confirmation, Washington was nominated for the Primetime Emmy Award for Outstanding Lead Actress in a Limited Series or Movie at the 68th Primetime Emmy Awards, as well as the Critics' Choice Awards' equivalent the same year. Confirmation was also nominated for the Emmy Award for Outstanding Television Movie at the Emmys. That same year, Washington launched Simpson Street, a production company, which has an overall deal with ABC Studios.

In 2017, Washington voiced a role in Cars 3.

In 2018, Washington made her directorial debut on Scandal, directing the tenth episode of the seventh season. She also appeared as Olivia Pope in two episodes of How to Get Away with Murder, as part of a crossover with Scandal. Scandal concluded after seven seasons in April 2018. That same year, Washington starred in the Broadway play American Son written by Christopher Demos-Brown, following two parents arriving at a police station in the middle of the night looking for answers.

2019–present: Continued success and acclaim
In 2019, Washington directed the seventh episode of the second season of Showtime's SMILF. She then  starred in Live in Front of a Studio Audience on ABC in a recreation of The Jeffersons, portraying the role of Helen Willis. The same year, she reprised her role in the film adaptation of the Broadway play American Son, which she also executive produced, for Netflix. The film had its world premiere at the Toronto International Film Festival on September 12, 2019, and was released on November 1, 2019.

In 2020, Washington served as an executive producer on The Fight, a documentary film revolving around legal battles lawyers for the ACLU face during the Trump administration, which had its world premiere at the Sundance Film Festival on January 30, 2020. That same year, she served as an executive producer and starred alongside Reese Witherspoon in the Hulu miniseries Little Fires Everywhere, an adaptation of Celeste Ng's 2017 novel of the same name. Washington directed the ninth episode of the fourth season of the HBO comedy series Insecure.

In September 2020, she won the Primetime Emmy Award for Outstanding Variety Special (Live) as a producer of the television special Live in Front of a Studio Audience. In December 2020, Washington starred in The Prom, directed by Ryan Murphy for Netflix, as Mrs. Greene.

From 2022, Washington will star in the recurring role of fourth-grade teacher Ms. Peyton in The Simpsons. She plays Professor Clarissa Dovey in the film adaptation of Soman Chainani's The School for Good and Evil.

Upcoming projects
In November 2018, Washington was attached to star in, and executive produce, 24/7 directed by Eva Longoria for Universal Pictures. She will star in and produce action film Shadow Force directed by Joe Carnahan for Lionsgate.

In August 2021, Washington planned to produce and star in, an adaptation of Diane Cardwells memoir, for Netflix. She will star in the war drama Six Triple Eight directed by Tyler Perry.

Personal life
Washington was engaged to actor David Moscow from October 2004 to March 2007. Washington married NFL player Nnamdi Asomugha on June 24, 2013 in Hailey, Idaho. They have a daughter and a son.

As a sort of souvenir or memento, she usually tries to keep something from every character that she plays, such as an item of wardrobe or a piece of furniture from the house the character lived in.

On May 19, 2013, she was the commencement speaker for her alma mater, George Washington University. Before giving her commencement address she was presented with an honorary Doctorate of Fine Arts.

Activism

In 2007, Washington and other celebrities joined for the 2007 Lee National Denim Day, supporting the Women's Cancer Programs of the Entertainment Industry Foundation. In September 2012, Washington spoke at the Democratic National Convention in favor of re-electing Barack Obama, with her speech focusing on addressing voter apathy.  Washington has also used her celebrity to support voter registration drives and recently encouraged her Twitter followers to make sure they have the appropriate ID needed to vote by contacting VoteRiders, a voter ID education organization.

Washington is also a supporter of LGBT rights. In August 2013, she was named an honorary chairperson of the GLSEN Respect Awards; and she received the GLAAD Vanguard Award on March 21, 2015. In June 2016, the Human Rights Campaign released a video in tribute to the victims of the Orlando nightclub shooting; in the video, Washington and others told the stories of the people killed there.

She is a member of the Creative Coalition; which is a board of actors, writers, musicians, and producers that explore issues that are at the forefront of national discourse. She is also a member of V-Day, a global movement that brings awareness to violence against women and girls. In March 2016, Washington and fellow ShondaLand colleagues, Ellen Pompeo, Viola Davis and Shonda Rhimes, appeared in a commercial endorsing Hillary Clinton for president.

Washington emceed the third night of the 2020 Democratic National Convention.

For the 2022 Georgia gubernatorial election, Washington endorsed Democratic candidate Stacey Abrams.

Filmography

Film

Television

As director

Theater

Awards and nominations

Among her many accolades, Washington has received a Primetime Emmy Awards, five NAACP Image Awards, a Teen Choice Award, and nominations for two Golden Globe Awards and four Screen Actors Guild Awards. One of the most successful women on television, she has received recognized by the Academy of Television Arts and Sciences (ATAS) with nine Emmy nominations, these being:
65th Primetime Emmy Awards (2013), Outstanding Lead Actress in a Drama Series, nomination, for Scandal
66th Primetime Emmy Awards (2014), Outstanding Lead Actress in a Drama Series, nomination, for Scandal
68th Primetime Emmy Awards (2016), two nominations
Outstanding Television Movie, nomination, for Confirmation
Outstanding Lead Actress in a Limited Series or Movie, nomination, for Confirmation
72nd Primetime Emmy Awards (2020), four nominations
Outstanding Lead Actress in a Limited Series or Movie, nomination, for Little Fires Everywhere
Outstanding Limited Series, nomination, for Little Fires Everywhere
Outstanding Television Movie, nomination, for American Son
Outstanding Variety Special (Live), win, for Live in Front of a Studio Audience: "All in the Family" and "Good Times"
74th Primetime Emmy Awards (2022), Outstanding Variety Special (Live), nomination, for Live in Front of a Studio Audience: "The Facts of Life" and "Different Strokes"

References

External links

1977 births
20th-century American actresses
21st-century American actresses
Living people
Activists from New York (state)
African-American actresses
African-American film producers
African-American television directors
American television directors
African-American television producers
Actresses from New York City
American film actresses
American actors of Jamaican descent
American people of English descent
American people of Scottish descent
American people who self-identify as being of Native American descent
American television actresses
American voice actresses
American women film producers
Audiobook narrators
Columbian College of Arts and Sciences alumni
American LGBT rights activists
People from the Bronx
Primetime Emmy Award winners
Sexual abuse victim advocates
Spence School alumni
American women television directors